Faza Navardan ("Astronauts") is an Iranian television series directed by Iranian actors Siamak Ansari and Peyman Ghasemkhani. The word Faza Navardan is the plural form of Faza-Navard, meaning astronaut in Persian.

Plot
The DVD does not stick to one plot. It is made up of different short films that involve comedy or different events happening.

Release 
Part I was released in December 2006 and Part II of the series released in early 2008. The third and fourth installments are now complete and Part III was released in August 2008.

In an interview with an Iranian magazine in 2008, Ansari dismissed reports that The Faza Navardan cast will definitely not be returning for a fifth installment. However, he confirmed that the "situation with the series is unpredictable and anything could happen. Peyman and I are very much in favour of returning for a fifth installment but there are certain issues that need to be resolved before work can begin preparation for the fifth installment."

Cast
Mohammad-Reza Hedayati
Siamak Ansari
Shaghayegh Dehghan
Reza Shafiei Jam
Nasrollah Radesh
Mohamed Shiri
Falamak Joneidi
Hadi Kazemi

References

Iranian television series
2000s Iranian television series
2006 Iranian television series debuts
2008 Iranian television series endings
Islamic Republic of Iran Broadcasting original programming